Jacek Kołumbajew (born 1991) is a Polish badminton player.

Achievements

BWF International Challenge/Series 
Men's doubles

  BWF International Challenge tournament
  BWF International Series tournament
  BWF Future Series tournament

References

External links 
 

1991 births
Living people
Polish male badminton players
Place of birth missing (living people)
20th-century Polish people
21st-century Polish people